The University Line is an obsolete designation to a light rail line of Utah Transit Authority's (UTA) TRAX system in Salt Lake City. It was the second TRAX line opened by UTA, after the Sandy/Salt Lake Line opened in 1999. The original line ran from the Delta Center (now Arena) Station to the Stadium Station, which is west of the Rice-Eccles Stadium on the University of Utah campus. The eastern end of the line was extended to the University Medical Center Station in 2003, and the western end was extended in 2008 to the new Salt Lake City Intermodal Hub (Salt Lake Central). The University Line continued running under that name through August 6, 2011, after which this designation was no longer used following a system redesign. The University of Utah is now served by the Red Line.

History
In April 2001, a three-week closure of the Sandy/Salt Lake line's northern portion, between Gallivan Plaza and Arena stations, in Downtown occurred when the switch at 400 South Main Street was built to accommodate the University Line's western turn into Downtown. The first  segment of the University Line opened on Saturday December 15, 2001 with service from the Delta Center to Rice-Eccles Stadium at a cost of 148.5 million, ahead of schedule and in time for the 2002 Winter Olympics, despite concerns that it would not be open in time. The entire UTA network (TRAX and buses) was free to all riders on opening day. The 89.4 million extension from Rice-Eccles Stadium to the University Medical Center opened in September 2003, a full 15 months ahead of schedule, adding  of track and three new stations: University South Campus, Fort Douglas, and University Medical Center.

Route description
The TRAX University Line was designated as UTA route 702.

Originally starting at the Delta Center (now Vivint Smart Home Arena) at South Temple Street and 300 West, the end of the line was extended several blocks to Salt Lake Central (Salt Lake City Intermodal Hub) in 2008, where it connects with the FrontRunner. The extension started at 250 South 600 West and proceeded north a half block to 200 South, stopping at Old GreekTown. The line then proceeded to 500 West and turned north and then east, stopping at the Arena (next to the Vivint Smart Home Arena). From the extension the route followed South Temple Street, turning south to Main Street. The line diverted at 400 South, heading east and ending its sharing of track with the Sandy/Salt Lake Line. Traveling on 400 South, trains would stop at Library, Trolley, and 900 East & 400 South before entering the University of Utah campus. Trains turned north at University Street, and then east at South Campus Drive and stopping at Stadium. The route continued on South Campus Drive to Wasatch Drive before stopping at University South Campus. Finally, it turned north at Wasatch Drive and followed that street to Fort Douglas and eventually terminating at University Medical Center, just south east of the Medical Center campus.

Stations

References

Rail infrastructure in Utah
Transportation in Salt Lake City
Railway lines opened in 2001